Csenge Fodor (born 23 April 1999) is a Hungarian handballer who plays for Győri ETO KC.

She made her international debut on 10 October 2021 against Slovakia.

Achievements 
National team
IHF Women's Junior World Championship: 
: 2018
EHF Youth European Championship: 
: 2015
European competitions
EHF Champions League:
: 2018, 2019
: 2022
: 2021
Domestic competitions
Nemzeti Bajnokság I:
: 2018, 2019, 2022
Magyar Kupa:
: 2018, 2019, 2021

References

      
1999 births
Living people
Sportspeople from Keszthely
Győri Audi ETO KC players
Hungarian female handball players